The Roman Provincial Forum is an archaeological area in Mérida, Spain, built in the 1st century AD. It was a public area of the Roman city of Emerita Augusta, founded in 25 BC. The title of "provincial" came from the city's role as the capital of the province of Lusitania. Together with the Roman Forum and other Roman edifices in the city,  it was inscribed in the UNESCO World Heritage List in 1993.

The temple received a massive marble decoration during the reign of the emperor Claudius.

Description
The Forum consisted of a large square sided by a monumental portico, with a large temple in the center, which was accessed through the Arch of Trajan.

Edifices included:
triumphal Arch of Tiberius, situated at the end of the cardo maximus (the main road of Emerita Augusta). Built of granite, it is 13.97 m. It was originally covered with marble.
a temple built under the reign of Tiberius

External links
Official Mérida webpage 

Merida Provincial
Forum, Mérida Provincial
Roman Forum, Provincial
Roman Forum, Provincial
Buildings and structures completed in the 1st century
1st-century establishments in the Roman Empire
Roman Forum, Provincial